The 2009 All-Ireland Senior Ladies' Football Championship was held between July 26 and September 27, 2009. Cork were the winners for the fifth season in a row.

Structure
Sixteen teams compete.
The top four teams from 2008 receive byes to the quarter-finals.
The quarter-finalists from 2008 receive byes to the second round.
The other eight teams play in the first round.
All games are knockout matches, drawn games being replayed.
The first-round losers playoff, with one team being relegated to the intermediate championship for 2010. Teams must spend two years as a senior team before they are eligible for relegation; teams that have not done so are exempt from relegation.

Fixtures and results

Early stages

Relegation match
Tipperary and Leitrim were exempt from relegation.

Donegal are relegated to the Intermediate Ladies' Football Championship for 2010.

Final stages

References

External links
Rssults and fixtures

!